The Moluccan scops owl (Otus magicus) is an owl found in the Maluku and Lesser Sunda Islands of Indonesia. It closely resembles the Rinjani scops owl.

The following subspecies are recognised:

 O. m. kalidupae (Hartert, EJO, 1903) - Kaledupa
 O. m. morotensis (Sharpe, 1875) - Morotai
 O. m. leucospilus (Gray, GR, 1861) - Halmahera, Ternate, Kasiruta, and Bacan
 O. m. obira Jany, 1955 - Obi
 O. m. bouruensis (Sharpe, 1875) - Buru
 O. m. magicus (Müller, S, 1841) - Seram and Ambon
 O. m. albiventris (Sharpe, 1875) - west-central Lesser Sundas

The Wetar scops owl (O. tempestatis) was previously considered a subspecies, but has since been split.

References

BirdLife Species Factsheet - Moluccan Scops-owl
 Owl pages

Moluccan scops ow
Birds of the Maluku Islands
Birds of the Lesser Sunda Islands
Moluccan scops ow